Jeongjong may refer to:

Korean rulers:
 Jeongjong, 3rd monarch of Goryeo (923–949) 
 Jeongjong, 10th monarch of Goryeo (1018–1046)
 Jeongjong of Joseon (1357–1419), a.k.a. Yi Bang-gwa, Yi Gyeong

Temple name disambiguation pages